The Asian Contemporary Art Fair was a contemporary art fair held annually in New York City. The first fair took place November 8–12, 2007. The second Asian Contemporary Art Fair occurred November 6–10, 2008.

The Asian Contemporary Art Fair (ACAF) was hosted by AsianArtWorks, a Korean company with offices in Beijing, Seoul and New York. The fair's primary sponsor was the Korean engineering company HNC.

Asian Contemporary Art Fair 2007

ACAF 2007 was the first art fair dedicated to Asian contemporary art to be held in New York City. It included 81 exhibitors from China, England, France, Germany, Hong Kong, India, Indonesia, Japan, Korea, Switzerland, Taiwan, Vietnam and the United States. The fair was held at New York's Pier 92 at 52nd Street and 12th Avenue.

The opening night preview reception was on November 8 with a performance by Korean-born dancer Sin Cha Hong.

As well as the exhibiting galleries, the fair's program included panel discussions, such as Robert Storr in dialogue with Xu Bing, and a special exhibition, “Simulasian: Refiguring ‘Asia’ for the 21st Century,” curated by Eric C. Shiner and Lilly Wei. Performances by artists Frank Fu, Cai Qing, and Qiu Zhijie and the Long March Project were also held throughout the fair's duration.

Participating Galleries 2007:

 1918 ArtSPACE, Shanghai
 2x13 Gallery, New York
 798 Avant Gallery, New York
 AHL Foundation, New York
 Aicon Gallery, New York/Palo Alto/London
 Alexander Ochs Galleries, Berlin/Beijing
 Amelia Johnson Contemporary, Hong Kong
 Arario Gallery, Cheonan, Beijing/Seoul/New York
 Art Vietnam Gallery, Hanoi
 ATM Gallery, New York
 Aura Gallery, Hong Kong/Shanghai
 Author Gallery, Shanghai
 Base Gallery, Tokyo
 Beatrice Chang Contemporary Art, Inc., New York
 Cais Gallery, Seoul
 Cheryl McGinnis Gallery, New York
 ChinaSquare, New York
 Chosun Art Gallery, Seoul
 Ego Gallery, Jakarta
 Ethan Cohen Fine Arts, New York
 Frederieke Taylor Gallery, New York
 Galerie Bhak, Seoul
 Galerie Caprice Horn, Berlin
 Galerie 89 Eyety Nine, Paris
 Galerie Kashya Hildebrand, Zurich
 Galerie Teo, Tokyo
 Gallery Artlink, Seoul
 Gallery Artside, Beijing/Seoul
 Gallery Espace, New Delhi
 Gallery Hirota Bijutsu, Tokyo
 Gallery Ihn, Seoul
 Gallery Kong, Seoul
 Gallery Q, Tokyo
 Gallery Terra Tokyo, Tokyo
 Gallery Touch Art, Paju
 Gallery Tsubaki, Tokyo
 Gallery Yamaguchi, Tokyo
 Gallery Yeh, Seoul
 Gana Art Gallery, Seoul
 Goedhuis Contemporary, London/Beijing/New York
 Hakgojae Gallery, Seoul
 Hino Gallery, Tokyo
 HNC Culture, Beijing/Seoul
 Hosane, Shanghai
 Interart Channel, Seoul/New York
 Iroom Gallery, Paju
 Jean Art Gallery, Seoul
 Jeff Cain Collection, Los Angeles
 Kimjaesun Gallery, Busan
 Kimyoungseob Photo Gallery, Seoul
 Krampf Gallery, New York
 Kukje Gallery, Seoul
 Leehwaik Gallery, Seoul
 Lillian Heidenberg Fine Art, New York
 Mem, Osaka
 Moca China, Hong Kong
 Nichido Contemporary Art, Tokyo
 Nodo Contemporary, Nagoya
 Olyvia Oriental, London
 One and J. Gallery, Seoul
 Parkryusook Gallery, Seoul
 Ping's Gallery, Tapei
 PYO Gallery, Seoul
 Red Gate Gallery, Beijing
 Rho Gallery, Seoul
 Sanshang Art, Hangzhou
 Seomi & Tuus Gallery, Seoul
 SHiNE Art Space, Shanghai
 Sotheby's, New York
 Sundaram Tagore Gallery, New York/Beverly Hills
 Susan Eley Fine Art, New York
 Taguchi Fine Art, Ltd., Tokyo
 Taipei Cultural Center, New York
 Tenri Cultural Institute, New York
 The Newgate East, Seoul
 The Tolman Collection of Tokyo, Tokyo/New York/Shanghai
 Today Art Museum, Beijing
 Tokyo Gallery + Btap, Tokay/Beijing
 Vadehra Art Gallery, New Delhi
 Wellside Gallery, Seoul/Shanghai
 Zendai MoMA, Shanghai

Asian Contemporary Art Fair 2008

The second ACAF was held from November 6–10, 2008, at Pier 92. It had 62 exhibitors from Australia, Bangladesh, China, England, France, Hong Kong, India, Indonesia, Japan, Korea, Philippines, Singapore, Spain, Switzerland, Taiwan, Vietnam and the United States.

An opening night reception was held on November 6. It included a fashion show by Angel Chang and performance artwork by Yibin Tian.

The fair commissioned two special exhibitions, one from Central Asia and the Middle East, and one from China. “Given Difference,” curated by Charles Merewether, examined art from Kazakhstan, Turkey, and Georgia. “My Bone, Flesh and Skin,” curated by Feng Boyi, brought together the work of five young contemporary Chinese artists who used the body as a subject for exploring contemporary states of existence.

Participating Galleries 2008:

 2x13 Gallery, Seoul
 798 Avant Gallery, New York
 A Thousand Plateau Art Space, Chengdu
 Aibo Fine Asian Art, Purchase
 Art for All Society, Macau
 Art Seasons, Beijing
 Art Vietnam, Hanoi
 Artside, Seoul/Beijing
 Base Gallery, Tokyo
 Bengal Gallery of Fine Art, Dhaka
 CCA Gallery, New York
 China Blue, Beijing
 China Previews Gallery, New York
 Chinese Contemporary, New York/Beijing/London
 East Asia Contemporary, Shanghai
 Eli Klien Fine Art, New York
 Exhibit A, New York
 Feizi Gallery, Shanghai
 Frederieke Taylor Gallery, New York
 Galeria Bellarte, Seoul
 Galeria Dolores de Sierra, Madrid
 Galerie Hussenot, Paris
 Galerie Lansar, Switzerland
 Gallery 456 – Chinese American Arts Council, New York
 Gallery Beyond, Mumbai
 Gallery Terra, Tokyo
 Iberia Center for Contemporary Art, Beijing
 IFA, Shanghai
 InfraRed Art Projects, Hong Kong/Paris
 Ippodo Gallery, Tokyo/New York
 Jamaica Center for Arts & Learning, New York
 Jean Art Gallery, Seoul
 Johyun Gallery, Seoul/Busan
 Leila Taghinia-Milani Heller Gallery, New York
 Lillian Heidenberg Fine Art, New York
 Linda Gallery, Jakarta/Singapore/Beijing/Shanghai
 Magee Gallery, Beijing/Madrid
 Max Protetch, New York
 Paris-Beijing Photo Gallery, Beijing
 PYO Gallery, Seoul/Beijing/Los Angeles
 Red Gate, Beijing
 Redlips Studio Gallery, Sydney
 Regis Krampf, New York
 Shanghai Zendai Museum of Modern Art, Shanghai
 Sheng Ling Gallery, Shanghai
 Shiseido HATANAKA, Tokyo
 Silverlens Gallery, Manila
 Sohn Wook Gallery, Gyeongju
 Studio Rouge, Shanghai
 Sundaram Tagore, New York
 T Space, Beijing
 Taipei Cultural Center, New York
 THE Gallery, New York
 Tibetan Bridge, New York
 Today Art Museum, Beijing
 Tolman Collection, New York
 TS1, Beijing
 UCCA, Beijing
 Vietnamese Contemporary Fine Art, New York
 White Box, New York
 Xerxes Fine Art, London
 Yamashita Gallery, Tokyo

Attendance and Reception

In 2007 approximately 25,000 people attended ACAF. Sales were reported as "steady". The fair received mostly positive reviews from a critical standpoint. Ken Johnson wrote of ACAF 2007 in The New York Times, “Fizzy and entertaining on the surface, it has a disquieting underside.”

In 2008, attendance at ACAF was estimated at 30,000 visitors. The effects of the financial crisis of 2007–2008 on the art market dominated the fair's media coverage.

AsianArtWorks moved its main office to Beijing, China in 2009.

References

Art exhibitions in the United States
Art fairs
Festivals in New York City